Malnad College of Engineering (MCE) is an engineering college located in Hassan, Karnataka, India. It was established in 1960, during the second 5 year plan of India, as a joint venture between the Government of India, Government of Karnataka and the Malnad Technical Education Society, Hassan. The institution is affiliated with the Visvesvaraya Technological University in Belgaum.

The college was affiliated to the University of Mysore but changed affiliation to Visvesvaraya Technological University, Belgaum.  In 2007 the college became autonomous.

Notable alumni

 Job Kurian, Singer
 Charan Raj, 2006, Music Director and Composer
 Javagal Srinath, Former Indian Cricketer
 Sudhir Shivaram, 1993, Indian wildlife photographer and entrepreneur

References

Affiliates of Visvesvaraya Technological University
Engineering colleges in Karnataka
Academic institutions formerly affiliated with the University of Mysore
Universities and colleges in Hassan district
1963 establishments in Mysore State
Educational institutions established in 1963